Sphaenorhynchus pauloalvini, or Paulo's lime treefrog, is a species of frog in the family Hylidae. It is endemic to eastern Brazil and is known from two locations in Bahia, Itabuna (its type locality) and Una.

Habitat and conservation
Sphaenorhynchus pauloalvini lives near on in ponds. It is threatened by habitat loss. It has not been recorded in the area of its type locality after its original description in 1973. However, another population was discovered in Una in 2007.

References

pauloalvini
Endemic fauna of Brazil
Amphibians of Brazil
Amphibians described in 1973
Taxonomy articles created by Polbot
Taxobox binomials not recognized by IUCN